Felipe Lima Lopes, or just Felipe Lima, (born 2 February 1989) is a Brazilian footballer who plays as a midfielder.

References

External links
Felipe Lopes at TFF

1989 births
Living people
Brazilian footballers
Brazilian expatriate footballers
Centro de Futebol Zico players
Botafogo de Futebol e Regatas players
Duque de Caxias Futebol Clube players
America Football Club (RJ) players
Bangu Atlético Clube players
Tupi Football Club players
FC Sioni Bolnisi players
Campeonato Brasileiro Série A players
Campeonato Brasileiro Série C players
Campeonato Brasileiro Série D players
Erovnuli Liga players
Association football midfielders
Brazilian expatriate sportspeople in Georgia (country)
Brazilian expatriate sportspeople in Turkey
Expatriate footballers in Georgia (country)
Expatriate footballers in Turkey
Footballers from Rio de Janeiro (city)